The Tewkesbury and Malvern Railway was a branch of the Midland Railway which ran from Ashchurch via Tewkesbury to Great Malvern in the United Kingdom. It was opened on 16 May 1864. At grouping in 1923 it became part of the London Midland and Scottish Railway.

Connections
It connected with the Worcester & Hereford Railway and the Birmingham and Gloucester Railway.

Structures
There were two significant bridges when first constructed –  over the River Avon at Tewkesbury and over the River Severn at Saxons Lode with five spans and a sliding centre section to allow tall masted ships to pass).  There was also a  tunnel and a long embankment and viaduct over a floodplain at The Mythe near Tewkesbury. The embankment, viaducts and remaining bridges were demolished in 2013 as part of the Tewkesbury area flooding improvement works with the bricks being reused in the reconstruction of the Gloucestershire Warwickshire Railway Broadway station. In 1961 a bridge over the M50 motorway was erected – as of 2012 this bridge has been removed & moved to the Bluebell Railway.

Closure
The section of line from Malvern to Upton-upon-Severn was closed in December 1952. The remainder closed to passengers on 14 August 1961. Freight continued to operate to Upton until July 1963 as far as Tewkesbury until December 1964.

References

External links
History in relation to Upton station
History at tewkesburyhistory.com

Midland Railway
Rail transport in Gloucestershire
Rail transport in Worcestershire
Railway lines in South West England
Malvern, Worcestershire
Tewkesbury